The following is a list of programs broadcast by Nat Geo Wild. Nat Geo Wild programming is sourced from various agencies, including UK and European distributors, terrestrial joint productions and National Geographic Studios (formerly known as National Geographic Television, or NGT) productions.
All programs are based on natural wildlife and wildlife history, with a heavy focus on nature's fiercest predators.

Current programming
 The Incredible Dr. Pol (2011–present)
 Dr. K's Exotic Animal ER (2014–present)
 Dr. Oakley, Yukon Vet (2014–present)
 Secrets of the Zoo (2018–present)
 Secrets of the Zoo: Tampa (2020–present)
 Secrets of the Zoo: Down Under (2020–present)
 Secrets of the Zoo: North Carolina (2020–present)
 Critter Fixers: Country Vets (2020–present)
 Heartland Docs, DVM (2020–present)
 America's Funniest Home Videos: Animal Edition (2021–Present)

Events
 Big Cat Week
 SharkFest
 Vetsgiving

A
 Amazonia
 Alpha Dogs
 Africa's Hunters
 America the Wild
 Animal Fight Club 
 Africa's Lost Eden
 Africa's Wild West
 Africa's Wild Side
 Africa's Deadliest 
 Africa's Hunters ll
 Africa's Wild West
 Amazon Underworld
 An Elephant's World
 Asia's Wild Secrets
 Alaskan Killer Shark
 Africa's Deadliest 4 
 Alaska's Glacier Bay
 Africa's Super Snake
 Africa's Blood River
 A Man Among Bears
 A Man Among Wolves
 Aloha Vet (2015–2015) 
 Attack of the Big Cats
 Animal ER (2016–2017)
 America's Wild Spaces
 America's Super-snake
 Amazon's Electric Fish
 Anaconda: Silent Killer
 American Chimpanzee
 Africa's Creative Killers
 America's National Parks
 Africa's Deadly Kingdom
 Alaska's Grizzly Gauntlet
 Africa's Hidden Wounders
 America's Greatest Animals
 Africa's Deadliest Kingdom
 Animal Fugitives (2011–2011)
 Africa's Wild Side: Dynasties
 Africa's Wild Kingdom: Reborn
 America's National Parks: Bears
 Africa's Deadliest: Young Blood
 American Buffalo: Battling Back
 Attenborough's Ark (2012–2013)
 Animal Intervention (2012–2012)
 America's National Parks: Bears
 Anaconda: Queen of the Serpents
 Alaska's Deadliest: Preator Prowl
 America's The Beautiful: Southwest
 America's The Beautiful: Wild Frontier
 American The Beautiful: Wild Southwest
 America The Beautiful: Might Northwest
 Among the Great Apes with Michelle Yeoh

B
 Big Blue
 Born Wild
 Boss Croc
 Badlands
 Bearhood
 Bug Attack
 Bug Brother
 Bird Nation
 Born In Africa
 Brutal Killers
 Bite, Sting, Kill
 Birth of A Pride
 Bizarre Dinos
 Big Sharks Rule
 Badass Animals
 Big Cats Games
 Be The Creature
 Big Cat Odyssey
 Blue Collar Dogs
 Bandits of Selous
 Battle for the Pride
 Bonecrusher Queens
 Bears of Fear Islands
 Borneo's Secret Kingdom
 Bavaria's Alpine Kingdom
 Big Cat Oddesy: Reveled
 Big Cats of The Timbavati
 Bite Me with Dr. Mike Leahy
 Blood Rivals: Lion vs Buffalo
 Black Mamba: Kiss of Death
 Battle of the Swamp Dragons
 Behind Russia's Frozen Curtain
 Born In Africa: The Circle of Life
 Big Animal Hunt with Filip Badrov
 Biggest and Baddest with Niall McCann
 Borneo's Secret Kingdom: Weird and Wild

C
 Crittercam
 City of Ants
 Cobra Mafia
 Cliffhangers
 Crocpocalypse
 Chimp Diaries
 Counting Tigers
 Cougar vs Wolf
 Croc Ganglands
 Croc Labyrinth
 Crocodile King
 Chasing Rhinos
 Crocs of Katuma
 Catching Giants
 Cat Attack-tics
 Cannibal Sharks
 Chimps Unchained
 Caught Barehanded
 Caught in The Act
 China's Wild Side
 Cameramen Who Dare
 Cuba's Secret Reef
 Clash of the Tigers
 Clash of the Crocs
 Clan of the Meerkat
 Chimps: Nearly Human
 Cheetah: Fatal Instinct
 Cheetah: Blood Brothers
 California's Wild Coast
 Call of the Baby Beluga
 Cheetah: Against All Odds
 Cat Wars: Lions vs Cheetah
 Cecil: The Legacy of a King
 China's Wild Side: Hidden Worlds
 Caught on Safari: Battle at Kruger
 Crikey! It's The Irwin's (Tv Series) 2018–Present
 Critter Fixers: Country Vets (Tv Series) 2020–Present
 Cesar Millan's Leader of the Pack (Tv Series) 2013-2013
 Cougars: Ninja of Jackson Hole (also American Cougar)

D
 Dino Bird
 Deadly 60
 Desert Seas
 Dino Autopsy
 Dolphin Army
 Dead By Dawn
 Deadly Summer
 Dolphin Dynasty
 Deadly Instincts
 Deep Sea Killers
 Deadly Super Cat
 Deadliest Bite Force
 Dark Side of Chimps
 Dive to Tiger Central
 Deadly Snakes of Asia
 The Dark Side of Hippos
 The Dark Side of Elephants
 Deep Sea Killers: Into the Dark
 Desert Lands of the Middle East
 Dogtown (Tv Series) 2008–2010
 Destination Wild (Tv Series) 2006-2006)
 Dog Whisperer with Cesar Millan (Tv Series) 2004–2012

E
 Elephant Queen
 Extinction Sucks
 Elephant Mountain
 Expedition Grizzly
 Europe's New Wild
 Eye of the Leopard
 Europe's Wild Islands
 Equator's Wild Secrets
 Europe's Last Leopard
 Europe's Last Wilderness
 Elephant: King of The Kalahari
 Expedition Wild (Tv Series) 2010–2011
 Extreme Animal Babies (Tv Series) 2016–2017

F
 Fishbowl
 Frozen Islands
 Fairy Penguins
 Feast Of The Grizzly
 Fur Seals: Battle For Survival
 Frozen Kingdom of The Show Leopard
 Fish Tank Kings (Tv Series) 2012–2014
 Florida Untamed – Croc Coast

G
 Gone Wild
 Girl Power
 Galapagos
 Giant Pandas
 Grizzly Empire
 Game of Lions
 Give Me Shelter
 Gorilla Murders
 Great Migrations
 Grizzly Cauldron
 Gangster Jackles
 Great Barrier Reef
 Giant Sea Serpent
 Giraffe: African Giant
 Giant Carnivorous Bats
 Giants of the Deep Blue
 Great Shark Chow Down
 Gorongosa: Paradise Reborn
 Great Apes with Michelle Yeoh
 Golden Seals of Skeleton Coast

H
 Hippo Hell
 Hummingbird
 Hyena Coast
 Hyena Queen
 Hidden Worlds
 Hippo vs Croc
 Hunter vs Hunted
 Hippos After Dark
 Hunting for Ngotto
 Haunt of the Hippo
 Hammerhead Highway
 How Big Can It Get?
 Hostile Planet: Africa
  Hunting the Hammerhead
 Hollywood Bear Tragedy
 Hunt for the Giant Squid
 Hidden Wounders of Europe
 How Dogs Got Theor Shapes
 Hyena: Bone Crushing Queens
 Humpbacks: Cracking the Code
 Hippos: Africa's River Beast
 Hummingbirds: Magic in the Air
 Hostile Planet: Africa (Tv Series)

I
 Ice Bear
 Invaders
 In the Womb
 Into the Abyss
 Incredible Bats
 Incredible Fish
 Insect from Hell
 Inside The Pack
 Iran's Wild Side
 Intimate Enemies
 Into The Okavango
 India's Lost Worlds
 India's Wild Leopards
 Is Your Dog a Genius?
 Island of the Monsoon
 Inside Nature's Giants
 Indonesia Beyond the Reefs

J
 Japan's Wild Year
 Jellyfish Invasion
 Jaguars Vs Crocs
 Jade Eyed Leopard
 Jaguar Beach Battle
 Journey into Amazonia
 Japan's Hidden Secret
 Jean Michel Cousteau's Ocean Adventure
 Jaguar: Catching the Cat (aka Hunt for the Shadow Cat)

K
 King Cobra
 Killer Seals
 Killer Shots
 Killer Shew
 Killer Instincts
 Killer Dragons
 Killer Snakes
 The Kill Zone
 Kangaroo King
 Kangaroo Kaos
 Kings of the Hill
 Komodo Dragons
 Kalahari Super cats
 Kingdom of The Apes
 Kingdom of The Forest
 Kingdom of The Oceans
 Kingdom of The Meadow
 Kingdom of The White Wolf
 Kingdom of The Blue Whale
 Kingdom of The Polar Bears
 Kingdom of The Apes: Battlelines
 Kingdom of The Mountain Baboons

L
 Little Killers
 Little Giants
 Lion Dynasty
 Lion Warriors
 Lion Kingdom
 Lion Gangland
 Leopard Queen
 Lion Battle Zone
 Lions Vs Giraffe
 Leopard Kingdom
 Leopard Huntress
 Lions on the Edge
 Living with Big Cats
 Lions Behaving Badly
 Land of 10,000 Grizzles
 Legends of the Ice World
 Land of A Thousand Caiman
 Lion Army: Battle to Survive
 Lost Sharks of Easter Island
 Leopards of Dead Tree Island
 Lions Brothers: Cubs to Killers
 Leopard and Hyena: Strange Alliance
 Lake Tanganyika: Africa's Blue Heart

M
 Man vs Lion
 Monster Frog
 Monster Fish
 Mother Croc
 Mav vs Shark
 Man vs Puma
 Monster Crocs
 Mission Critical
 Monster Catfish
 Monster Snakes
 Mexico Untamed
 Monkey Thieves
 Man vs Monster
 Maneater Manhunt
 Monster Croc Hunt
 Man, Woman, Dog
 Man Among Cheetahs
 Monster Jellyfish Attack
 Morays: The Alien Eels
 Man Eater of The Congo
 Monster Fish of the Congo
 Madagascar: A World Apart
 Mystery of the Cave Spider
 Madagascar: Legendary Lemus
 Mission Critical: India's Wild Cats
 Mega Hammerhead: Ultimate Predator
 Monsters of the Wild: Creepy Crawlers
 Monsters of the Wild: Wonderfully Weird

N
 Nordic Wild
 Ninja Shrimp
 New Wave Warriors
 Namibia's Sanctuary of Giants
 Naked Mole Rat: Nature's Weirdest Superhero

O
 Otter Town
 Octopus Volcano
 Orca Killing School
 Okavango: River of Dreams
 Outback Wrangler (Tv Series) 2011–2019

P
 Pride
 Puma!
 Pythonathon
 Psycho Kitty
 Predator CSI
 Project Manta
 Predator Fails
 Predator Land
 Penguinpalooza
 Project Grizzly
 Paradise Islands
 A Penguin's Life
 Prairie Dog Manor
 Philly Undercover
 Predators In Peril
 Panda's Goes Wild
 Polar Bear Alcatraz
 Phantom Wolverine
 Predator Bloodlines
 Planet of the Birds
 Polar Bear Invasion
 Pet Talk (Tv Series)
 Penguin Death Zone
 Prehistoric Predators
 Predators of the Sea
 Predators In Paradise
 Planet of the Reptiles
 Pumas: At The End Of The World
 Predator Fail: When They Attack
 Planet Carnivore: Perfect Killers
 Pond Stars (Tv Series) 2014-2014
 Python Hunters (Tv Series) 2010–2012
 Pop Goes The Vet (Tv Series) 2020–
 Pristine Seas: The Power Of Protection
 Pumas At the End of the World: Rebirth

Q
● Queen of The Chase

● Queen of The Baboons

● Quest for the Megafish of the Amazon

R 
 Rescue Ink
 Raptor Force
 Red Sea Jaws
 Rhino Rescue
 Rebel Monkeys
 Restless Planet
 Real Angry Birds
 Return of The Lion
 Relentless Enemies
 Russia's Wild Tiger
 Regime of the Queen
 Red Sea, Green Future
 Return of the White Lion
 Racoon: Backyard Bandit
 Return of The Hammerhead
 Return of the Spider Monkey
 Raccoon Dogs: Alien Invaders

S
 Sahara
 Striker!
 Super fish
 Seahorses
 Sharkatraz
 Sky Safari
 Storm Cats
 Sloth Bears
 Super Pride
 Space Crabs
 Shark Night
 Speed Kills
 Shadow Cats
 Salmon Wars
 Swamp Lions
 Sea Strikers
 Shark Island
 Shark Nicole
 Shark Vs Tuna
 Super Squirrel
 Shark vs Surfer
 Spine Chillers
 Shark Kill Zone
 Squid Vs Whale
 Street Monkeys
 Savage Kingdom
 Shark Attack-tics
 Soul of The Cat
 Squid vs. Whale
 Snake Wranglers
 Super Predators
 Savage Kingdom
 Snake Underworld
 Secret Shark Pits
 Strangest Bird Alive
 Secrets of the Wild
 Sumatra's Last Tiger
 Saved by the Lioness
 Saved from the Spill
 Savage Island Giants
 Secrets of Wild India
 Secrets of Bull Shark
 Serengeti Speed Queen
 Shark Attack Experiment
 South America Untamed
 Surviving The Serengeti
 Secrets of the King Cobra
 Sir Lanka: Leopard Dynasty
 Sebella: The Mircale Cheetah
 Snow Leopard of Afghanistan
 Snake Island: Wild & Deadly
 Search for the Giant Octopus
 Search for the Ultimate Bear
 Spine Chillers: Vampire Bats
 Secrets of the Mediterranean
 South Africa: Cradle of Killers
 Secrets of The Desert Elephants
 Sharks Vs Dolphins: Blood Battle
 Searching for the Snow Leopard
 Snake City (Tv Series) 2014–Present
 Saving Giraffes: The long Journey Home
 Secrets Of Wild India: Kings of the Jungle

T
 The Flood
 Tiger Wars
 The Eagles
 Taiwan Wild
 Tiger Queen
 The Ice Bear
 Totally Wild
 The Invaders
 The Wild West
 The Desert Sea
 Triumph of Life
 The Phantom Cat
 The Lion Ranger
 The Jungle King
 Tiger's Revenge
 Tiger On the Run
 The Living Edens
 The Last Lioness
 The Kangaroo King
 Tiger Shark Terror
 The Bear Evidence
 Trails of the Wild
 The Real Serengeti
 The Leopard Rocks
 Thailand's Wild Side
 That Shouldn't Fly
 Tiger Queen of Taru
 Tree Climbing Lions
 Thailand's Wild Cats
 The Wolf Mountains
 The Lakeshore Killers
 The Sharks of Hawaii
 The Rise of Black Wolf
 The Giant Robber Crab
 The Way of the Cheetah
 The Real Black Panther
 The Sand Eating Shark
 The Last Orangutan Eden
 The Lion Pride Next Door
 Turf War: Lions and Hippos
 The Alps: Winter's Fortress
 The Great Elephant Gathering
 The World's Most Famous Tiger
 The Hidden Kingdoms of China
 Ten Deadliest Snakes with Nigel Marven
 The Animal Extractors (Tv Series) 2015–2017
 The Adventures of Dr. Buckeye Bottoms (Tv Series) 2017–2019

U
 Ultimate Cat
 Ultimate Bear
 Ultimate Hippo
 Ultimate Shark
 Ultimate Predator
 Ultimate Enemies
 Untamed Philippines
 Ultimate Honey Bager
 United Sharks of America
 Ultimate Rivals: Cats vs Dog
 Ultimate Viper: Fear the Fang
 Ultimate Philippines: Hidden World
 Ultimate Philippines: Hidden Wonders
 Unlikely Animal Friends 2012–2015 (Tv Series)

V
 Volcano Sharks
 Victoria Falls: Africa's Garden of Eden
 Vanishing Kings: Desert Lions of Nambi
 Vanishing Kings II: Desert Lion Legacy

W
 Wild Asia
  Wild Vence
 Wild Egypt
 Wild Arctic
 Wild India
 Wild Chile
 Wild Coast
 Wild China
 Wild Arctic
 Wild Congo
 Wild Dubai
 Wild Japan
 Wild Korea
 Wild Winter
 Wild Alaska
 Wild Hawaii
 Wild Islands
 Wild France
 Wild Russia
 Wild Nights
 Wild Nordic
 Wild Persia
 Wild Amazon
 Wild Canada
 Wild Uganda
 Wild Florida
 Wild Hunters
 Wolf Vs Bear
 Wild Islands
 Wild Atlantic
 Wild Lapland
 Wild Dolphins
 Wild Portugal
 Wild Scotland
 Wild Bahamas
 Wild Botswana
 Wild Columbia
 Wild Thailand
 Wild Kalahari
 Wild Far East
 Wild Indonesia
 Wild Indochina
 Wild Galapagos
 Wild Australia
 Wild Sri Lanka
 Wild Argentina
 Wild Southwest
 Wild Antarctica 
 What The Shark?
 Wild Costa Rica
 Wild Detectives
 Wild Philippines
 Wild Mississippi
 Wild Little Cats
 Wild South Africa
 Wild Dog Diaries
 Wild Yellowstone
 Wild New Zealand
 World of The Wild
 Winter Wonderland
 Wild Year: Siberia
 Wild Great Britain
 Will Work for Nuts
 Wild Cats of India
 Wild Great Britain
 Whales of the Deep
 Wild Untamed Brazil
 World's Worst Venom
 Wonders of the Ocean
 Wild Central America
 Walking With Giraffes
 Where Ocean's Collide
 Wild Peru: Fight for Life
 World's Deadliest Lions
 World's Deadliest Crocs
 World's Deadliest Whale
 Wild Scotland: Highlands
 Wild Alaska: Artic Summer
 World'd Deadliest Snakes
 When Crocs Ate Dinosaurs
 Wild Japan: Snow Monkey's
 Winter's Hidden Wonders
 Wild Taiwan: Jungle Island
  Wild Artic: Kingdom Of The Ice
 Wild Australia: Kangaroo King
 Wild Australia: Will to Survive
 Wild India: Land of Wounders
 Wild Peru: Andes Battleground
 Wild Yellowstone: Fire and Ice
 Wild New Zealand: Lost Paradise
 Wild Mongolia: Land of Extremes
 Wild Botswana: Lion Brotherhood
 Wild Great Britain: Animal Tales
 Wild Canada: Legends of The North
 When Sharks Attack (2013–present)
 Wild Caribbean's Deadly Underworld
 Wild Hunter's: Deadly Killers of Africa
 Worlds's Weirdest Animal Faces (Tv Series)

Y 
 Yellowstone Battleground
 Yellowstone Wolf Dynasty

Z
 Zambezi
 Zoo Confidential
 Zeb's Big Fish: Hammerhead Invasion

References

 Lists of television series by network